The 2010–11 Ulster Rugby season was Ulster's 17th season since the advent of professionalism in rugby union, and their second under head coach Brian McLaughlin. This season marked the debuts of two South Africans, scrum-half Ruan Pienaar (replacing Isaac Boss, who had moved to Leinster) and second row forward Johann Muller. Ulster were quarter-finalists in the European Rugby Champions Cup, and semi-finalists in the Celtic League. Ruan Pienaar was Player of the Year. Nevin Spence was IRUPA Young Player of the Year.

Forwards coach Jeremy Davidson left at the end of the season.

Staff

Squad

Senior squad

Players in (Season 2010/2011)
 Johann Muller: from Sharks
 Tim Barker: from Glasgow Warriors
 Ruan Pienaar from Sharks
 Pedrie Wannenburg: from Bulls
 Adam D'Arcy from Manly RFC
 Paul Emerick from Overmach Parma
(Xavier Rush's move canceled at players request)

Players out (Season 2010/2011)
 Isaac Boss to Leinster
 Ed O'Donoghue to Leinster
 Timoci Nagusa to Montpellier
 Justin Fitzpatrick Retired
 Tamaiti Horua Retired due to Injury
 Matt McCullough Retired due to Injury
 Cillian Willis to Connacht Rugby
 David Pollock Retired due to Injury

Academy squad

Heineken Cup

Pool 4

Biarritz won the tiebreaker over Ulster with a 6–4 advantage in head-to-head competition points.

Quarter-final

Celtic League

Semi-final

Ulster Ravens

British and Irish Cup

Pool C

Home attendance

Ulster Rugby Awards
The Ulster Rugby Awards ceremony was held on 10 May 2011 at the Culloden Hotel, Holywood. Winners were:

Ulster Rugby Personality of the Year: Johann Muller
Ulster Player of the Year: Ruan Pienaar
Supporters Club Player of the Year: Johann Muller
Young Ulster Player of the Year: Nevin Spence
Ulster Academy Player of the Year: Craig Gilroy
Most Improved Ulster Player of the Year: Adam D'Arcy
Youth Player of the Year: Conall Doherty, City of Derry R.F.C.
Club of the Year: City of Armagh RFC
Club Player of the Year: Paul Pritchard, Ballymena RFC
Schools Player of the Year: John Creighton, Campbell College
Dorrington B. Faulkner Award: Ronnie Clements, Limavady RFC

Season reviews
"Review of Ulster's Season", Ulster Rugby, 1 June 2011

References

2010-11
2010–11 in Irish rugby union
2010–11 Celtic League by team
2010–11 Heineken Cup by team